Ritanserin, also known by its developmental code name R-55667, is a serotonin antagonist medication described as an anxiolytic, antidepressant, antiparkinsonian agent, and antihypertensive agent. It was never marketed for medical use due to safety problems but has been used in scientific research to study the serotonin system.

Pharmacology

Pharmacodynamics
Ritanserin acts as a selective 5-HT2A (Ki = 0.45 nM) and 5-HT2C receptor (Ki = 0.71 nM) antagonist. It has relatively low affinity for the H1, D2, α1-adrenergic, and α2-adrenergic receptors (39-, 77-, 107-, and 166-fold lower relative to 5-HT2A, respectively). The affinity of ritanserin for the 5-HT1A receptor is less than 1 μM. In addition to its affinity for the 5-HT2A and 5-HT2C receptors, ritanserin also binds to and antagonizes the 5-HT1D, 5-HT2B, 5-HT5A, 5-HT6, and 5-HT7 receptors.

History
The atypical antipsychotic risperidone was developed from ritanserin.

Society and culture

Names
Ritanserin is the generic name of the drug and its 
It is also known by its developmental code name R-55667.

Availability
Ritanserin was never approved or marketed for medical use.

Research
Ritanserin was tested in clinical trials for depression, anxiety, schizophrenia, and migraine. It was also found to improve sleep in human volunteers.

Synthesis

Aminothiazole (2-thiazolamine) (1) is condensed with 2-acetylbutyrolactone [517-23-7] (2) under DS-trap until the water has separated. Condensation of this β-keto lactone can be visualized to involve initial attack on the reactive butyrolactone by the primary nitrogen; cyclodehydration of that hypothetical intermediate 3 gives 6-(2-hydroxyethyl)-7-methyl-[1,3]thiazolo[3,2-a]pyrimidin-5-one, CID:82612453 (4). Halogenation of the terminal alcohol with phosphorus oxychloride then yields 6-(2-chloroethyl)- 7-methyl-5H-thiazolo[3,2-a]pyrimidin-5-one, [86488-00-8] (5). Alkylation with 4-(bis(4-fluorophenyl)methylene)piperidine, [58113-36-3] (6) would complete the synthesis of ritanserin (7).

See also
 Ketanserin
 Setoperone

References

5-HT2A antagonists
5-HT2C antagonists
Abandoned drugs
CYP2D6 inhibitors
Lactams
Fluoroarenes
Piperidines
Thiazolopyrimidines